Chalcis was a small ancient Iturean majority state situated in the Beqaa Valley, referred to at various times either as a kingdom or tetrarchy, named for and originally based from the city of the same name. The ancient city of Chalcis (a.k.a. Chalcis sub Libanum, Chalcis of Coele-Syria was located midway between Berytus and Damascus. The modern town of Anjar in Lebanon is believed to be the site of ancient Chalcis sub Libanum, although this has not been definitively demonstrated. The ruins of a Roman temple are located a few kilometers south-west of Anjar near Majdal Anjar. Other sources indicate that Chalcis sub Libanum is located at "Husn esh-Shadur" near Baalbek.

Independent kingdom
Originally, Chalcis was a city in Coele-Syria. When the Seleucid influence in the area began to dissipate, the Itureans took over a region stretching from the Mediterranean Sea to near Damascus. They made Chalcis the capital of their realm, while Baalbek was the center of worship. The founder of this realm seems to have been Ptolemaeus, son of Menneus, an Ituraean dynast.

During the time of Alexander Jannaeus, Hasmonaean king of Judea, Ptolemaeus had to cede part of his territory to the Hasmonaeans. This area was later known as Iturea (Iturea, in an ethnic sense, covered the much larger area in which the Itureans were settled). In 64 BCE Ptolemaeus bribed the Roman general Pompeius to refrain from annexing his realm and allow him to continue to rule as Tetrarch. Pompey also returned to him the areas lost to Jannaeus when he brought an end to the independent Hasmonaean state in 63 BCE.

Roman vassal state

Chalcis was a vassal state under Roman rule during the remainder of Ptolemaeus' reign. In 40 BCE, he was succeeded by his son Lysanias. Lysanias supported the efforts of the Hasmonean scion Antigonus II Mattathias to take the throne of Judea in 42 and 40 BCE, allying with him against the Roman client king Herod, whom he temporarily supplanted on his Parthian-supported second attempt. Lysanias's anti-Roman sympathies eventually led to his execution by Mark Antony in 33 BCE, at the instigation of Cleopatra VII of Egypt, who had eyes on his territories.

Though Antony gave Lysanias' territory to Cleopatra, a remnant realm of Chalcis persisted after this disaster, with the most important cities being Chalcis and Abila. Cleopatra leased it to Zenodorus, possibly a son of Lysanias, and following her suicide in 30 BCE, Augustus initially allowed Zenodorus to rule as Tetrarch, only to depose him in 23 BCE for conducting raids into Trachonitis, which had prompted complaints from his neighbors. Augustus then gave some or all of his lands to Herod, including Iturea, Batanaea, Trachonitis and Auranitis. Little is known about Chalcis itself in the time immediately after Lysanias' death; Chalcis sub Libanum and its district may have been made part of the Roman province of Syria, while Abilene, the area around Abila, appears to have made up a separate statelet at least part of the time.

Division
The districts surrendered to Herod continued to be ruled by him and his family, who in time came to control the core regions of the former kingdom as well. After Herod's death in 4 BCE, Iturea, Trachonitis, Gaulanitis, Batanea, Paneas and Auranitis became a tetrarchy under Philip, one of his sons, who ruled as a tetrarch until his death in AD 34. Meanwhile, Abilene may have gone to another Lysanias, mentioned in the Gospel of Luke  as tetrarch of Abilene in the time of John the Baptist. It is possible, however, that the reference to Lysanias in Luke is an anachronistic reference to the Lysanias put to death by Antony.

In AD 37, Emperor Caligula gave Herod Agrippa I the former tetrarchies of Philip (namely Iturea, Trachonitis, Gaulanitis, Batanea, Paneas and Auranitis) and Lysanias (Abilene) with the title of king. His realm was subsequently augmented in AD 40 by the regions of Galilee and Perea, formerly ruled by Herod Antipas (4 BCE - AD 39), and in AD 41 by the regions of Judea, Idumea and Samaria, formerly ruled by Herod Archelaus (4 BCE - AD 6) and then formed the province of Judaea (AD 6 - 41). Agrippa I ruled all these territories until his death in AD 44.

Meanwhile, in AD 39, the district of Iturea was given by Caligula to a certain Soemus, who is called by Dio Cassius (lix. 12) and by Tacitus (Annals, xii. 23) "king of the Itureans." Soemus reigned until his death in AD 49, when his kingdom was incorporated into the province of Syria (Tacitus, l.c.).

In AD 41, at Agrippa's request, his brother Herod was given Chalcis and allowed the title of basileus (king) by Claudius. King Herod of Chalcis reigned until his death in AD 48, whereupon his kingdom was given to Agrippa's son Agrippa II, though only as a tetrarchy.

Agrippa II was forced to give up the tetrarchy of Chalcis in AD 53, but in exchange Claudius made him ruler with the title of king over the territories previously governed by Philip (Iturea, Trachonitis, Gaulanitis, Batanea, Paneas and Auranitis), and Lysanias (Abilene). In 55, the Emperor Nero added to his realm the cities of Tiberias and Taricheae in Galilee, and Livias (Iulias), with fourteen villages near it, in Perea.

The tetrarchy of Chalcis, previously surrendered by Agrippa II in AD 53, was subsequently in AD 57 given to his cousin Aristobulus, the son of Herod of Chalcis. After the death of Aristobulus in AD 92, Chalcis was absorbed into the province of Syria.

According to Photius, Agrippa II died at the age of seventy in the third year of the reign of Trajan (AD 100, but statements of Josephus, in addition to the contemporary epigraphy from his kingdom, cast this date into serious doubt. The modern scholarly consensus holds that he died before 93/94. Following his death his realm as well came under the direct rule of Rome.

Rulers of Chalcis
 Ptolemaeus, son of Menneus, 85–40 BCE
 Lysanias, son of Ptolemaeus, 40–36 BCE
 Zenodorus, 36–23 BCE (initially under Cleopatra)
 Herod the Great, 23–4 BCE
 Lysanias (Abilene), time of John the Baptist?
 Herod Agrippa I (Batanaea, Abilene and other areas), AD 37–44
 Soemus (Iturea), AD 38–49
 Herod of Chalcis (Chalcis), AD 41–48
 Herod Agrippa II (Chalcis), AD 48–53; (Batanaea, Abilene and other areas), AD 53–93/94
 Aristobulus of Chalcis (Chalcis), AD 57–92

See also
 1st century in Lebanon

References

Ancient Lebanon
Roman Syria
Former kingdoms